3121 is a studio album by Prince released in 2006.

It may also refer to:

3121 (number)
3121 Tamines, a minor planet
The year 3121 BC
4th millennium for the year 3121